Muhammad Faridul Huda (died 1999) was a Bangladesh Nationalist Party politician, former Minister, and the former Member of Parliament of Comilla-2.

Early life and education
Huda was born into a Bengali Muslim family in the village of Kamaura in Ashuganj, Brahmanbaria, Tipperah district, Bengal Presidency (now Bangladesh). He studied up until he became a Doctor of Philosophy.

Career
Huda was elected to parliament from Comilla-2 as a Bangladesh Nationalist Party candidate in 1979.

References

Bangladesh Nationalist Party politicians
1999 deaths
2nd Jatiya Sangsad members
20th-century Bengalis
People from Ashuganj Upazila